Nadeem Abbasi (born 10 November 1968) is a former Pakistani cricketer who played in three Test matches in 1989.

He also captained Khan Research Laboratories and Rawalpindi.  During this tenure, he led KRL to a runners-up spot in the National One Day Cup in 2000. After retirement, he became a very successful Rawalpindi Coach and Regional Selector, as well as working in the Pakistan National Cricket Academy and Abbottabad Region, grooming players, who later played for Pakistan.

References

1968 births
Living people
Pakistan Test cricketers
Pakistani cricketers
Rawalpindi cricketers
Khan Research Laboratories cricketers
Cricketers from Rawalpindi